The 2021 IUP Crimson Hawks football team represented the Indiana University of Pennsylvania in the 2021 NCAA Division II football season as a member of the Pennsylvania State Athletic Conference (PSAC). Led by fifth-year head coach Paul Tortorella, the Crimson Hawks compiled an overall record of 7–3 and a mark of 5–2 in conference play, finishing third in the PSAC West Division.

Schedule

Game summaries

vs. Kutztown
In the first game of the season, the Crimson Hawks beat the number 18 ranked Kutztown Golden Bears by a score of 29–26. After going down early, they came back by scoring 22 points in the fourth quarter. Wide receiver Duane Brown caught 10 passes for 131 yards and quarterback Javon Davis completed 19 of 29 passes for 204 yards and two scores.

vs. Shepherd
IUP lost in their second game of the season against the Shepherd Rams in week two, by a score of 21–37 in a game that saw the Crimson Hawks outgained 330 yards to 554. Quarterback Javon Davis completed 20-of-30 passes for 266 yards and three scores.

at Mercyhurst
On the road versus , the Crimson Hawks won 48–13 in the IUP debut for former Division I quarterback Harry Woodbery. Woodbery, a transfer from Eastern Illinois, had missed the prior two games with COVID-19, but threw four touchdowns in his return. He was 15-of-22 passing for 146 yards, and also ran four another score.

vs. Gannon
Despite blowing a 14–0 start, the Crimson Hawks came back and won in their homecoming game against  on October 2.

at Clarion
Traveling to Clarion, Pennsylvania, to play the winless , the Crimson Hawks dominated in a 58–21 win, scoring four touchdowns in the second quarter alone.

at Slippery Rock
The Crimson Hawks traveled to Slippery Rock for their sixth game of the year, and stunned the number six ranked team in a 48–21 victory for IUP. It was the only conference loss of the season for Slippery Rock, and snapped a 19-game conference winning streak. Harry Woodbery threw for 312 yards and five touchdowns for IUP.

References

IUP
IUP Crimson Hawks football seasons
IUP Crimson Hawks football